Novoivanovka is a rural locality (a village) in Kuganakbashevsky Selsoviet, Sterlibashevsky District, Bashkortostan, Russia. The population was 6 as of 2010. There is 1 street.

Geography 
Novoivanovka is located 17 km northeast of Sterlibashevo (the district's administrative centre) by road. Yumaguzino is the nearest rural locality.

References 

Rural localities in Sterlibashevsky District